Eremo di Sant'Onofrio (Italian for Hermitage of Sant'Onofrio) is an hermitage located in Serramonacesca, Province of Pescara (Abruzzo, Italy).

History

Architecture

References

External links

 

Onofrio, Serramonacesca
Serramonacesca